Checkstyle is a static code analysis tool used in software development for checking if Java source code is compliant with specified coding rules.

Originally developed by Oliver Burn back in 2001, the project is maintained by a team of developers from around the world.

The current stable release is version 10.5.0 which supports Java versions from 11 to 17.

Advantages and limits 

The programming style adopted by a software development project can help to ensure that the code is compliant with good programming practices which improve the quality, readability, re-usability of the code and may reduce the cost of development. The checks performed by Checkstyle are mainly limited to the presentation of the code. These checks do not confirm the correctness or completeness of the code.

Checkstyle rules are not programming style, they are merely rules for formatting the code. These are just restrictions taking away freedom of structuring the code because someone invented enforcing strict rules in formatting the code believing that it would be better for programmers for some productivity reasons, no evidence support these claim nor serious studies were conducted to examine the thesis.

Examples of available modules 

Checkstyle defines a set of available modules, each of which provides rules checking with a configurable level of strictness (mandatory, optional...). Each rule can raise notifications, warnings, and errors. For example, Checkstyle can examine the following:
 Javadoc comments for classes, attributes and methods;
 Naming conventions of attributes and methods;
 The number of function parameters;
 Line lengths;
 The presence of mandatory headers;
 The use of imports, and scope modifiers;
 The spaces between some characters;
 The practices of class construction;
 Multiple complexity measurements.

Usage 

Checkstyle is available as a JAR file which can run inside a Java VM or as an Apache Ant task. It can also be integrated into an IDE or other tools.

See also

 List of tools for static code analysis
 EclipseCS - Eclipse plugin for checkstyle.
 Checkstyle-IDEA - Checkstyle plugin for IntelliJ IDEA and Android Studio
 SevNTU-Checkstyle - extension for EclipseCS with number of check that are not part of checkstyle upstream.
 Checkstyle Addons - Additional Checkstyle checks
 Checkstyle for PHP - a PHP version of Checkstyle

References

External links 
 
 

Static program analysis tools
Java (programming language) libraries
Java development tools
Software using the LGPL license
Free software testing tools